Ophichthus macrops is an eel in the family Ophichthidae (worm/snake eels). It was described by Albert Günther in 1910. It is a marine, tropical eel which is known from the western central Pacific Ocean.

References

macrops
Taxa named by Albert Günther
Fish described in 1910